The Chief of the Cabinet of Ministers of the Argentine Nation (JGM), more commonly known simply as the Cabinet Chief is a ministerial office within the government of Argentina tasked with overseeing the government's general administration and acting as a link between the national executive and the Argentine National Congress. The position was created by the 1994 amendment to the Argentine Constitution.

The Cabinet Chief is not a prime minister, as in Argentina's presidential democracy the role of head of government is still bestowed upon the president. However, the Cabinet Chief is still constitutionally obligated to give account of the general course of the government's policies before Congress, and may be removed through a vote of no confidence (moción de censura) with an absolute majority in both chambers of Congress.

The current Cabinet Chief is Agustin Rossi, who was sworn in on 15 February 2023 by President Alberto Fernández.

History
The office of the Chief of the Cabinet of Ministers was established by the 1994 amendment to the Argentine Constitution. It was part of the agreements brokered by the two largest parties in Argentina at the time, the Justicialist Party (PJ) and the Radical Civic Union (UCR), in what is now known as the Pact of Olivos; the UCR, then led by former president Raúl Alfonsin, sought to reduce the significant political powers of the Presidency and shift towards a parliamentary system. In the end, however, the overarching nature of Argentina's political system following the reform remained decidedly presidential, as the Chief of the Cabinet of Ministers acts more as an extension of the President to whom the head of state may delegate a certain number of responsibilities, while also being constitutionally obligated to report to the National Congress.

The first Cabinet Chief was Eduardo Bauzá, who was appointed on 8 July 1995 by President Carlos Saúl Menem.

Attributes

The attributes of the Chief of the Cabinet of Ministers are established by the articles 100 and 101 of the Constitution of Argentina. Most of the Cabinet Chief's duties are related to the organization of the cabinet's work agenda and the general course of the government's performance, as well as acting as an intermediary between the Executive Power and the Argentine National Congress.

Specifically, articles 100 and 101 state:

Headquarters
The office of the Cabinet Chief is located at the Somisa Building (officially known as the "Teniente General Castiñeiras" building), former headquarters of the Sociedad Mixta Siderúrgica Argentina (SOMISA), a state-owned metallurgy company created in 1972. Following the privatization of Somisa in 1993, the building was acquired by the national government to be used as the headquarters of the newly created Cabinet Chief's office. The building, designed in the modernist style by Mario Roberto Álvarez, was built from 1966 to 1977 and was the first building in Argentina to be made entirely out of 3 mm steel sheets and to be fully welded. It is located on Julio Argentino Roca Avenue in the Monserrat barrio of Buenos Aires.

List of Chiefs of the Cabinet of Ministers

References

External links
 

 
Government of Argentina